Prasophyllum pilligaense is a species of orchid endemic to New South Wales. It has a single tubular, shiny dark green leaf and up to thirty scented greenish brown to brownish and white flowers. It is only known from a few populations in the Coonabarabran district.

Description
As with others in the genus, the flowers are inverted so that the labellum is above the column rather than below it. There is an egg-shaped, tapered yellow to yellowish green callus with a dark green base in the centre of the labellum and extending slightly past the bend. Flowering occurs between late September and late October.

Taxonomy and naming
Prasophyllum pilligaense was first formally described in 2018 by David Jones and Lachlan Copeland from a specimen collected at Rocky Glen near Coonabarabran and the description was published in Australian Orchid Review. The specific epithet (pilligaense) refers to the Pilliga forest to which this species is confined.

Distribution and habitat
This leek orchid has been found in five populations in the Coonabarabran district, growing with scattered shrubs in woodland.

References

pilligaense
Orchids of New South Wales
Endemic orchids of Australia
Plants described in 2018